Marsha Miller (born January 15, 1969, in Rochester, New York) is a retired beach volleyball player from  the United States, who won the silver medal in the women's beach team competition at the 1999 Pan American Games in Winnipeg, Manitoba, Canada, partnering Jenny Pavley.

References
 

1969 births
Living people
American women's beach volleyball players
Beach volleyball players at the 1999 Pan American Games
Sportspeople from Rochester, New York
Pan American Games silver medalists for the United States
Pan American Games medalists in volleyball
Medalists at the 1999 Pan American Games
20th-century American women